Nanjing Audit University (NAU) is a public university in Nanjing, China. Focusing on audit and accounting, the university is co-sponsored by Ministry of Education, Ministry of Finance, National Audit Office, and Jiangsu Provincial People's Government since 2011.

The university was founded in 1983 and has an emphasis on economics and management, and also offers courses in law, languages, literature, science, and engineering. There are more than 15,000 students on three campuses: Mochou Campus (named after nearby Mochou Lake) in the Jianye District of Nanjing, Pukou Campus on the southern slope of Mount Lao, and Xianlin Campus.

History 
 August 1983. Nanjing School of Finance and Trade was established under the approval of Jiangsu Provincial Government. Under the supervision of Nanjing Municipal Government, the school was a vocational one, offering 2 to 3 years of certificate training.
 May 1987. Nanjing School of Finance and Trade was transferred to be jointly administered by Chinese National Audit Office(CNAO), Nanjing Municipal Government and Jiangsu Education Committee. In the same year, it was renamed as Nanjing Audit Institute.
 December 1990. Nanjing Audit Institute was under the direct leadership of CNAO and jointly administration of CNAO, Jiangsu Provincial Government and Nanjing Municipal Government with CNAO the major supervisor. The institute is still of technical academy level and enrolls students from all over China.
 February 1993. Nanjing Audit Institute was enhanced to a university.
 June 1997. Under the approval of Jiangsu Degree Committee, Nanjing Audit Institute was licensed to award BA degree.
 February 2000. Nanjing Audit Institute was transferred to be under the direct leadership of Jiangsu Education Committee.
 April 2002. Under the approval of Jiangsu Provincial Government, Nanjing College of Finance was merged into Nanjing Audit Institute, thus the new Nanjing Audit University was born.
 August 2011. the Ministry of Education, the Ministry of Finance, the National Audit Office and the People's Government of Jiangsu Province construct Nanjing Audit University together.

Schools and departments 
NAU has many areas of specialisation:

School of International Auditing
School of Accounting
School of Finance
School of Economics
School of Management
School of Information Science
School of Law and Politics
College of Auditing and Evaluation
Department of Foreign Languages
Department of Teaching Chinese As a Foreign Language
Department of Applied Mathematics
Physical Education Department
School of Administration (Adult education, Vocational Technology)
Jinshen College

NAU was also one of the first educations institutions to offer courses in e-commerce.

Since 1998 it has an affiliation and cooperation with the Association of Chartered Certified Accountants (ACCA) to promote international CPAs.

See also
Chinese Institute of Certified Public Accountants
China Accounting Standards

References

External links
 Nanjing Audit University webpage

Universities and colleges in Nanjing